Walls of Rome is a video game developed by Mindcraft in 1993 for DOS. It is set in the Roman Empire and focuses on siege warfare.

Plot
Walls of Rome is a tactical wargame about siege warfare and is set in the time of the Roman Empire. In the game, the player takes the role of either attacker or defender in a siege assault of a fortification. Each side has an assortment of weapons, troops, and techniques from various historical civilizations and time periods, ranging from Phoenicians to Roman auxiliaries, to cavalry, and from siege towers to Greek fire. The player can also build their own scenarios and play them or trade them with a friend who also owns the game.

Reception
In 1994, Computer Gaming World stated that Walls of Rome "vastly improved" on Sieges game engine and AI. The magazine concluded that it "is not only a solid extension of the original Siege engine, it offers loads of replay value as well". The game was reviewed in 1994 in Dragon #207 by Sandy Petersen in the "Eye of the Monitor" column. Petersen gave the game 3 out of 5 stars.

Walls of Rome was a runner-up for Computer Gaming Worlds Wargame of the Year award in June 1994, losing to Clash of Steel. The editors wrote of the game, "In this sequel to Siege, the AI is less predictable than in the previous releases, the historical research is extremely solid (including many obscure battles that you can't find anywhere else and historical uniforms/banners which are something of a miniaturist's dream), and a multi-player modem capacity that takes the game up another notch in our opinion".

Other reviewers included ASM magazine in August 1994 and again in February 1994, and PC Player in January 1994.

Development
Walls of Rome uses an improved version of the game engine employed by Mindcraft's previous game, Siege (1992). The game was designed by Ali Atabek, Scott Baker, Paul Kellner, and James Thomas, with Kellner also serving as the project coordinator and Thomas as the lead programmer. The game featured art by Scott Baker, Steve Beam, Steve Burke, and Juan L. Galceran.

References

External links
Walls of Rome at MobyGames

1993 video games
DOS games
DOS-only games
Mindcraft games
Real-time strategy video games
Video games developed in the United States
Video games set in the Roman Empire